Serbia men's national under-18 and under-19 basketball team may refer to:
 Serbia men's national under-18 basketball team
 Serbia men's national under-19 basketball team